Philip Marcus Levy (1934 – 2011) was a British psychologist who specialised in the field of mathematical psychology.

Life
Phil Levy was born in 1934 in Redcar, North Riding of Yorkshire but grew up in Leeds where he was a pupil at Leeds Grammar School. He took his first degree at the University of Leeds followed by a PhD on discriminant analysis at the University of Birmingham (1958). He stayed at Birmingham, initially as a research fellow and then as lecturer and senior lecturer. He was appointed the first chair in psychology at the University of Lancaster in 1972.

He was active in the British Psychological Society and edited the British Journal of Mathematical and Statistical Psychology. He was elected  president of the society in 1978.  In his presidential address he called on psychologists to reflect on the assumptions underlying the science.  As he said: I feel that we have a simplified view of science, perhaps  due - for understandable sociohistorical reasons - for our anxious desire to receive the accolade of being 'scientific' [...] I believe that science is much more a matter of social exchange than many of us are prepared to admit.

Work
His expertise was in mathematical and statistical psychology. He was an expert in the construction of tests in education and training.

Awards
 1977-1978 - President, British Psychological Society

References

1934 births
2011 deaths
British psychologists
Mathematical psychologists
Presidents of the British Psychological Society
Academics of Lancaster University